Holland State Park is a public recreation area covering  in Park Township, Ottawa County, four miles (6 km) west of the city of Holland, Michigan.  The state park consists of separate Lake Macatawa and Lake Michigan units on the northern side of the channel connecting Lake Macatawa with Lake Michigan. It is often the most visited state park in Michigan, receiving between 1.5 and 2 million visitors annually.

Activities and amenities
In addition to swimming, boating, fishing, and camping, the park features dune areas, picnic areas, playgrounds, and views of Holland Harbor and the Holland Harbor Light, "Big Red". The Lake Macatawa unit features a campground, beach, and public boat launch. The Lake Michigan unit features a paved campground, pavilion, and broad sandy beach along Lake Michigan. The adjacent channel breakwall is a popular walk in the summer, though it is not intended for public use and can be treacherous during adverse weather.

References

External links

Holland State Park Michigan Department of Natural Resources
Holland State Park Map Michigan Department of Natural Resources

State parks of Michigan
Protected areas of Ottawa County, Michigan
Protected areas established in 1926
1926 establishments in Michigan
IUCN Category III
Beaches of Michigan
Landforms of Ottawa County, Michigan